Yevgeni Alekseyevich Ivanov-Barkov (4 March 1892 – 18 May 1965) was a Soviet film director and screenwriter who had a significant role in the development of Turkmen cinema in the 1940s and 1950s.

Filmography
 Poison (1927)
 Mabul (1927)
 Judas (1930)
 Dursun (1940)
 The Prosecutor (1941)
 The Faraway Bride (1948)
 Extraordinary Mission (1958)

References

Bibliography

External links

1892 births
1965 deaths
People from Kostroma
Stalin Prize winners
Recipients of the Order of the Red Banner of Labour
Soviet film directors
Soviet screenwriters
Turkmenistan film directors

Turkmenistan screenwriters
Burials at Donskoye Cemetery